Rockyford is a village in southern Alberta, Canada. It was founded in 1913 upon the arrival of the Canadian National Railway.

Demographics 

In the 2016 Census of Population conducted by Statistics Canada, the Village of Rockyford recorded a population of 316 living in 144 of its 151 total private dwellings, a  change from its 2011 population of 325.

See also 
List of communities in Alberta
List of villages in Alberta

References

External links 

1919 establishments in Alberta
Villages in Alberta